John Andrew Martin (April 10, 1868 – December 23, 1939) was an American journalist, attorney, soldier, and politician, who represented Colorado in the U.S. House of Representatives. He recruited troops and commanded the 115th Supply Train, Fortieth Division during World War I.

Early life and education
He was born in Cincinnati, Ohio, a son of Hugh and Ann (Bohan) Martin. He acquired a public school education in Mexico and in Fulton, Missouri until he was twelve years old and began working in a tobacco factory. He moved with his parents to Kansas in 1884 and worked on a farm in Turon.

Career
He came to Colorado in 1887. He was employed on railroad construction work and as a locomotive fireman from 1887 to 1894; He worked on the construction of the Colorado Midland Railroad and then as a locomotive engineer on the Santa Fe. He became publisher of the La Junta Times and was member of the city council of La Junta in 1895 and 1896. He studied law and was admitted to the bar in 1896. In 1897, he began practicing law in Pueblo.

He was a member of the State house of representatives in 1901 and 1902. He was the city attorney in 1905 and 1906. He was elected as a Democrat to the 61st and 62nd Congresses (March 4, 1909 – March 3, 1913). He declined to be a candidate for reelection in 1912 and resumed the practice of law. In 1914, he challenged incumbent U.S. Senator Charles S. Thomas for the Democratic nomination, but dropped out of the race before the primary election. He was again the city attorney in 1916 and 1917.

At the outbreak of the First World War, he was attempted to enlist, but was denied due to his age and he was the head of a family. Undeterred, he recruited a volunteer battalion of National Guardsmen in Pueblo and was commissioned a major over the group of men that he recruited. He commanded the 115th Supply Train, Fortieth Division. After the war, he was a member of the San Isabel Chapter Number 2 of the Disabled American Veterans of the World War. He was also post commander of the Pueblo Post Number 2 of the American Legion.

He resumed the practice of law in Pueblo, Colorado. Twenty years after his first service in the House of Representatives, he was elected to the 73rd Congress and to the three succeeding Congresses and served from March 4, 1933, until his death. During that time, he worked on the Railroad Retirement Act of 1935 and the Railroad Unemployment Insurance Act. Among his other efforts, he framed holding company legislation while on the House Interstate and Foreign Commerce Committee.

Personal life
On September 6, 1892 or 1902, he married Rose May Chitwood at Wellington, Kansas. They had a daughter, Stella. He wrote a novel based on the lives of his wife's parents who were pioneer settlers in Kansas. Published in 1908, it depicted the "dawn life of the prairie West and its people."

He contacted a case of ptomaine poisoning and died in Washington, D.C. on December 23, 1939. He was buried in Mountain View Cemetery, Pueblo, Colorado.

See also
 List of United States Congress members who died in office (1900–49)

References

External links

John Andrew Martin (1868-1939) at politicalgraveyard.com

1939 deaths
1868 births
Democratic Party members of the United States House of Representatives from Colorado
Democratic Party members of the Colorado House of Representatives